Loughermore is a mountain in County Londonderry, Northern Ireland. It is the 847th highest mountain in Ireland and lies in a large uplands area known as the Loughermore Hills, which is bounded to the west and south by the Rivers Faughan and Foreglen and to the east, by the River Roe.

There is also Loughermore forest.
It is called Fairview by most of the local community.

References

Mountains and hills of County Londonderry
Marilyns of Northern Ireland